Waikawau is a rural community in the Waitomo District and Waikato region of New Zealand's North Island, beside Waikawau River.

There are also small settlements of the same name on both the west and east coasts of Coromandel.

Waikawau is astride meshblocks  1016301 and 1016400, which had 51 people, living in 21 houses, in 2013 over the wider area.

It features the only publicly accessible beach between Marokopa and Awakino. The only way to access the beach is through a walking track and farming tunnel, which was dug through sandstone cliffs by three men in 1911.

The area has been a popular spot for freedom camping during whitebait season and summer. Signs were put in place in 2015, advising visitors it is illegal to camp on private land.

Dracophyllum strictum grows extensively in the area.

Education

References

Waitomo District
Populated places in Waikato